Benzocyclooctatetraene is a polycyclic hydrocarbon with chemical formula , composed of fused a benzene ring and a cyclooctatetraene ring. Only the benzene ring is aromatic in this compound.

Method to preparation 
ring-opening of benzotricyclooctadiene
ultraviolet irradiation of benzobicyclo[2.2.2]octatriene
1,2-dehydrocyclooctatetraene method.

See also 
Heptalene

References

Polycyclic aromatic hydrocarbons